Los dos apóstoles ("The Two Apostles") is a 1966 Mexican comedy film. It stars Luis Aguilar and Sara García.

Cast
as per credits order  
Luis Aguilar as Juan Heredia
Fernando Casanova as Pedro Heredia
Lucha Moreno 		
Dacia González 		
Sara García as Doña Angustias
Andrés Soler as Don Serapio
Armando Soto La Marina as 'Chicote'
Miguel Arenas 		
José Eduardo Pérez 		
Lucha Palacios 		
Héctor Suárez as the Padre

External links
 

1966 films
Mexican comedy films
1960s Spanish-language films
1960s Mexican films